Anthropogeny is the study of human origins. It is not simply a synonym for human evolution by natural selection, which is only a part of the processes involved in human origins. Many other factors besides natural selection were involved, ranging over climatic, geographic, ecological, social, and cultural ones. Anthropogenesis, meaning the process or point of becoming human, is also called hominization.

History of usage
The term anthropogeny was used in the 1839 edition of Hooper's  Medical Dictionary and was defined as "the study of the generation of man". The term was popularized by Ernst Heinrich Haeckel (1834–1919), a German naturalist and zoologist, in his groundbreaking books, Natural History of Creation (German: Natürliche Schöpfungsgeschicht) (1868) and The Evolution of Man (German: Anthropogenie) (1874). Haeckel was one of the first biologists to publish on evolution. Haeckel used the term Anthropogeny to refer to the study of comparative embryology and defined it as "the history of the evolution of man". The term changed over time, however, and came to refer to the study of human origins.

The last use of the word anthropogeny in English literature was in 1933 by William K. Gregory. There was a gap in the usage of the term from 1933 to 1993. Anthropogeny was reintroduced in 1993  and in 
2008 and is now back in academic use at the Center for Academic Research and Training in Anthropogeny (CARTA) at the University of California, San Diego.

Anthropogeny vs. anthropology
 
The root in ancient Greek anthropos means human and -logia means discourse or study, and -genesis means the process of creation or origin.
Anthropology, therefore, is quite literally the study of humans, whereas anthropogeny is the breakdown of the word anthropos again but with the link word -geny (γένη, γένος) which again literally means the study of the birth and creation of humans.

According to the ancient Greeks who came up with the terms, anthropology is the sum of many sciences relating to human study. There is social, economic, civil and comparative anthropology.

Anthropogony derives from the word 'anthropo' again and -gony (γόνοι), meaning 'the causing of, the birth of', both in a literal and metaphorical sense, referring to what caused by human born or/and conceived/created.

Anthropogeny on the other, is whatever derives from humans. -geny ('γένης᾽), meaning 'the born' or who is born of, but also the gender.

According to Gregory (1933), anthropologists are interested in measuring and quantifying aspects of being human, whereas anthropogenists are interested in "piecing together the broken story of the 'big parade' that nature has staged across the ages". According to the definition of the words, Gregory's statement is wrong.

So anthropology is the study of humans and anthropogeny, is the study of what humans 'gave birth to', to its core definition, although there have been many confusions by those who do not really have an understanding of the words' origins.

Modern anthropology is typically divided into four sub-fields: social anthropology or cultural anthropology, biological anthropology, linguistic anthropology, and archaeology. The field of anthropology has origins in the natural sciences, humanities, and social sciences.

The field of anthropogeny is also influenced by the natural sciences, humanities, and social sciences, however, given that it is the study of the origin of humans, it is also influenced by fields ranging from anatomy and biomechanics to neurology and genetics.

A comprehensive list of Domains of Scientific Discipline relevant to anthropogeny can be found in the Matrix of Comparative Anthropogeny (MOCA), associated with the Center for Academic Research and Training in Anthropogeny (CARTA), at the University of California, San Diego.

See also
 Origin myth, for nonscientific accounts
 Human evolution, for scientific accounts
 Evolutionary anthropology
 Dawn of Humanity

References

External links

 Matrix of Comparative Anthropogeny (MOCA)

Anthropology
Origins